Pickerel is an unincorporated community in the northeast corner of Langlade County, Wisconsin, United States. The community is located on Wisconsin Highway 55, in the town of Langlade. Pickerel has a post office with ZIP code 54465. The community has a volunteer fire department, which also serves the town of Ainsworth and part of the town of Nashville in Forest County.

Images

References

External links

Unincorporated communities in Wisconsin
Unincorporated communities in Langlade County, Wisconsin